Brasília Air Force Base – ALA1  is a base of the Brazilian Air Force that operates next to the Brasília-President Juscelino Kubitschek International Airport. It was created on December 3, 1963, and is known throughout Brazil for being the base of operations for the Brazilian Presidential Airplane, which is the main aircraft responsible for transporting the President of Brazil.

History
The origin of the Base goes back to 27 November 1957 when President Juscelino Kubitschek signed the decree 42,697 establishing the Brasília Detachment of Air Force Base. However, it was only on 4 December 1963, with Decree 53,077 that Brasília Air Force Base on its own right was created. Dedication took place on 1 January 1964.

Units
The following units are based at Brasília Air Force Base:
 Special Transportation Group (GTE), using the VC-1, the VC-2, the VC-99A/C-99A, the VH-35, and the VH-36 Caracal. 
 6th Squadron of Air Transportation (6°ETA) Guará, using the C-95BM & CM Bandeirante, the C-98A Grand Caravan, the C-97 Brasília, and the U-100 Phenom.

Access
The base is located 11 km from downtown Brasília.

Gallery
This gallery displays aircraft that are or have been based at Brasília Air Force Base. The gallery is not comprehensive.

Present aircraft

Retired aircraft

See also

List of Brazilian military bases
Brasília–Pres. Juscelino Kubitschek International Airport

References

External links

Federal District (Brazil)
Brazilian Air Force
Brazilian Air Force bases
Buildings and structures in Federal District (Brazil)
Brasília 
Transport in Brasília